Daniel Richard Moder (born January 31, 1969) is an American cinematographer who has made such films as Secret in Their Eyes, The Mexican, and Fireflies in the Garden. He is married to actress Julia Roberts.  He received a Primetime Emmy Award nomination for his cinematography in the television film The Normal Heart.

Career
Moder began his career as a production assistant in the 1995 action film Crimson Tide. The following year, he worked on the set of the 1996 sports drama film The Fan. From then, he worked in the Camera and Electrical Department on films like The Brave, Enemy of the State, The Big Tease, and Tuesdays with Morrie. He made his debut as a cinematographer in the short comedy film Kid Quick. As a cinematographer, he has since worked on films like Grand Champion, |Border, The Hit, Fireflies in the Garden, Jesus Henry Christ, Highland Park, Plush, The Normal Heart, and Secret in Their Eyes. Moder has also worked on a number of short films as a cinematographer. He has also worked on The Mexican, Full Frontal, Mona Lisa Smile, Mr. & Mrs. Smith, Friends with Money, and Spider-Man 3.

Personal life
Moder was married to Vera Steimberg from 1997 to 2002. He met his second wife, actress Julia Roberts, on the set of her film The Mexican in 2000. After his divorce from Steimberg was finalized, he and Roberts wed on July 4, 2002, in a small ceremony at her ranch in Taos, New Mexico. They have three children. 

He is a practicing Hindu along with his wife.

Filmography

Awards and nominations

References

External links 

 

1969 births
Living people
American cinematographers
People from Los Angeles
University of Colorado Boulder alumni
American Hindus